Neacoryphus is a genus of seed bugs in the family Lygaeidae. There are about five described species in Neacoryphus.

Species
These species belong to the genus Neacoryphus:
 Neacoryphus albonotatus (Barber, 1923)
 Neacoryphus bicrucis (Say, 1825) (whitecrossed seed bug)
 Neacoryphus circumlinitus (Distant, 1893)
 Neacoryphus rubrocephala Brailovsky, 1977
 Neacoryphus verecundus (Distant, 1893)

References

Further reading

External links

 

Lygaeidae